Bill Francoeur (November 18, 1948 – February 2, 2015) was a musical theatre composer and actor, who produced over 75 musicals for the amateur theatre market in a career spanning over 25 years.

Children who sing on Francoeur's CDs include Brooke Mercer, Kelsie Mercer, Kate Lewis, Victoria Olona and Jessica Olona.

Career
Francoeur was a junior and senior high school teacher for ten years before turning to playwriting.  His work includes the music and lyrics for the musical The Ghost & Mrs. Muir (2005), co-written with longtime collaborator Scott DeTurk, with a book by James Mellon.  With DeTurk, Francoeur also created the musical Western Star, with book by Dale Wasserman, garnering California's Elly Award for Best Original Work (1993).  In 2002, his children's musical, Oz!, was produced Off-Broadway.

Francoeur began to collaborate with playwright Tim Kelly in the mid-1980s, with whom he created Oz! and numerous other works.

Bill Francoeur died February 2, 2015, in Colorado.  He had four children.

Musicals

Babes in Toyland (with Tim Kelly)
Bah, Humbug!
The Big Bad Musical
Blue Suede Paws (with Kelly)
Cactus Pass Jamboree
Captain Bree and Her Lady Pirates (also called The Lady Pirates of Captain Bree)
Charleston! (with Kelly)
Cinderella's Glass Slipper
Coney Island of Dr. Moreau (with Kelly)
Disco Knights
Don't Say No to the U.S.O.! (with Kelly)
Doo-Wop Wed Widing Hood
Drabble (1985)
Enchanted Sleeping Beauty
The Enchantment of Beauty and the Beast
Everything's Groovy! (with Kelly)
Fee, Fi, Fo, Fum!
Flapper! (with Kelly)
Flower Power!
Friday Knight Fever
Fussin' an' a-Feudin'
Going... Going... Gone With the Breeze
Gone With the Breeze (with Kelly)
The Great Ghost Chase
Groovy!
Guess What I Did Last Summer
Hankerin' Hillbillies
The Headless Horseman
Hee Haw Hayride (1993) (with Kelly)
The Internal Teen Machine
Is There a Doctor in the House? (with Kelly)
Jack and the Giant
Jitterbug Juliet
Kilroy Was Here (1995)
Kokonut Island (with Kelly)
Kokonut Kapers
Krazy Kamp — The Musical
Lady Pirates of the Caribbean
Little Luncheonette of Terror (1988) (with Kelly)
A Little Princess — The Musical (1996)
Lucky, Lucky Hudson and the 12th Street Gang (with Kelly)
Magnolia
Murder at Crooked House
The Nifty Fifties (with Kelly)
No Strings Attached
Nutcracker
Oh, Horrors! It's Murder!
Oz! (1995) (with Kelly)
Pecos Bill, Slue-Foot Sue and the Wing-Dang-Doo!
Pied Piper - The Musical
A Pirate's Life For Me
Rock Around the Block
Romeo and Harriet
Royal Bachelor
The Secret Garden (1996) (with Kelly)
Shake With a Zombie (with Kelly)
Shakespeare Comes to Calamity Creek (1997)

Sleepy Hollow
Snow White and the Seven Dwarfs (with Kelly)
The Stories of Scheherazade
The Story of Hansel and Gretel
The Story of Velveteen Rabbit
Sunset Trail
Surf's Up!
Tale of Beauty and the Beast
There's a Monster in My Closet!
Through the Looking Glass
Time and Time Again (1987) (with Kelly)
Tiny Thumbelina
Twinderella - The Musical
Unhappily Ever After
Wagon Wheels West
Way Out West in a Dress
We the People — the Musical
Westward, Whoa!
When in Rome...
The Wild, Wild, Wildest West
Wipeout!
The Wishing Tree (1988)
Wonderland!
Wrangler Ranch
The Yankee Doodle Song and Dance Man
You Ain't Nothin' But A Werewolf (with Kelly)

References

External links
Doddllee
List of Francoeur works

American male composers
American composers
20th-century American dramatists and playwrights
1948 births
Male actors from Colorado
Actors from Manchester, New Hampshire
2015 deaths